Emticicia aquatica  is a Gram-negative bacterium from the genus of Emticicia which has been isolated from fresh water in Korea.

References 

Cytophagia
Bacteria described in 2015